The Cyrkle was an American rock band active in the early and mid-1960s. The group charted two Top 40 hits, "Red Rubber Ball" and "Turn-Down Day".

Career
The band was formed by guitarists and lead singers Don Dannemann and Tom Dawes (who also played bass guitar), and Jim Maiella (the original drummer), who all met while studying at Lafayette College in Easton, Pennsylvania. Dannemann enlisted in the US Coast Guard in 1966. The other members were Earle Pickens on keyboards and Marty Fried on drums. They were originally a "frat rock" band called The Rhondells but were later discovered and managed by Brian Epstein, who was best known as manager of the Beatles. Epstein found out about the band when his business partner, New York attorney Nathan Weiss, heard them in Atlantic City, New Jersey, on Labor Day of 1965. Epstein became their manager and renamed them, as a reference to the circular roundabout known as Centre Square, located in downtown Easton. John Lennon provided the unique spelling of their new name. They were produced by John Simon.

In the summer of 1966, they opened on 14 dates for the Beatles during their US tour. On August 28, they headed the opening acts performing prior to The Beatles at Dodger Stadium. The other artists who appeared were Bobby Hebb, the Ronettes, and the Remains. Before touring with The Beatles, the Cyrkle had a engagement at the Downtown Discothèque in New York City. They were also on the bill for the final Beatles concert at Candlestick Park on August 29, 1966.

The Cyrkle is best known for their 1966 song "Red Rubber Ball", which went to No. 2 on the Billboard Hot 100 chart. It sold over one million copies, and was awarded a gold disc. It was co-written by Paul Simon, of Simon and Garfunkel, and Bruce Woodley of The Seekers, and was released by Columbia Records. Later in 1966, the band had one more Top 20 hit, "Turn-Down Day" (No. 16). After the release of their debut album, Red Rubber Ball, they recorded a second album, Neon, in late 1966, and a movie soundtrack, The Minx, in 1967 (not released until 1970). They followed that with various singles and then disbanded in mid-1968.

Both Dawes and Danneman became professional jingle writers after the Cyrkle disbanded. Dawes wrote the famous "plop plop fizz fizz" jingle for Alka-Seltzer. Danneman wrote jingles for Continental Airlines and Swanson Foods. He penned the original 7Up "Uncola" song. Dawes produced two albums for the band Foghat, Rock & Roll (1973) and Energized (1974), and co-wrote the song "Wild Cherry" on the latter. Marty Fried left the music business to attend law school and graduated from Wayne State University in Detroit in 1972. He worked as a bankruptcy attorney in suburban Detroit. Earle Pickens became a surgeon (retired) in Gainesville, Florida.

Revival

In the spring of 2014, the keyboardist of The Cyrkle, Mike Losekamp, joined a Columbus, Ohio based band called The Gas Pump Jockeys, a regionally popular classic rock act performing in the Ohio region and neighboring states.

Joining band members Pat McLoughlin (guitarist/vocalist), Scott Langley (drummer), Don White (lead guitarist) and initially bassists Rick Brown (d. 2015) and later Mike "Roscoe" Rousculp (d. 2019), the band immediately incorporated the Cyrkle's two biggest hit songs, "Red Rubber Ball" and "Turn Down Day" into their show featuring Losekamp on lead vocals. The songs became a highlight of each show the Gas Pump Jockeys performed.

Buoyed by the crowd's responses and a growing audience, McLoughlin elected to pursue the possibility of merging with surviving members of the original Cyrkle for a possible 50th anniversary reunion tour. This mission proved to be more daunting than anticipated. Losekamp had had no communications with any of his band mates since The Cyrkle disbanded in 1968 (following the death of Brian Epstein the prior year). The original lineup had retired from being rock musicians and established professional careers living and working in various parts of the United States. They had only performed together twice as a band (sans Losekamp), once in 1981 (in support of the "Hands Across America" event), and a second time in 1988, when they performed at their college reunion in Easton Pennsylvania. Although they remained on very friendly terms with each other, they rarely communicated over the next 50 years.

Locating the original members to discuss a reunion was challenging for McLoughlin as he searched every state east of The Mississippi River for surviving members. He eventually located original drummer Marty Fried, now a lawyer, living in the lower peninsula of Michigan. He also found keyboardist Earl Pickens, who had established himself as a surgeon in north Florida. In both instances, their very valuable careers were not conducive for being in the revised Cyrkle. The Cyrkle's original bass player, Tom Dawes (who had had a very remarkable career as a jingle writer), had died in 2007. So, McLoughlin set his sights on locating the band's original singer and lead guitarist Don Dannemann.

Dannemann had established his own advertising jingle company (Mega-Music) in New York City in the early 1970s. In 2008, he retired his business, moved away from New York City and was enjoying life as a retiree. He would occasionally perform in a duet, but for all practical purposes his musical career lay dormant. After months of failed attempts, McLoughlin at last located him in the latter part of the summer of 2016. He brokered a call with Losekamp, resulting in the first conversation with the two band mates in 50 years to occur. Losekamp explained the mission of trying to reunite the Cyrkle, and Dannemann expressed his interest in the project.

Following a pair of conference calls in which McLoughlin explained the business model to all members, Dannemann agreed to travel to Columbus, Ohio to reconnect with Losekamp and to meet the other members of his Central Ohio band. He and the band quickly bonded, both musically as well as on a personal level. He agreed to join the other members of the Gas Pump Jockeys to form a new version of The Cyrkle featuring himself and Losekamp.

The Cyrkle performed for the first time to a live audience for the filming of a promotional video, and to record a live album (Full Cyrkle) in November 2016. They performed professionally for the first time in five decades three months later in February 2017 in Columbus, Ohio. On October 13, 2017, The Cyrkle began touring nationally, starting in Lakewood, New Jersey, typically appearing with other classic rock contemporaries from the 1960s music era. As of 2022. they continue to perform across the US. 

The reformed lineup, beginning in 2016, featured original members Don Dannemann and Michael Losekamp, joined by Pat McLoughlin, Mike Rousculp (d. 2019), Don White, Scott Langley, and later by Mike Shoaf (2019-2021). Dean Kastran, a founding member of The Ohio Express, joined the band in June 2021.

Marty Fried died of pancreatic cancer on September 1, 2021 at age 77. He was a retired bankruptcy lawyer who practiced in Southfield, Michigan, a suburb of Detroit.

Discography

Singles

Reissue single
1966 – "Red Rubber Ball"/"Turn-Down Day"

Albums
Original albums

Compact disc re-issues
1991 – Red Rubber Ball (A Collection) – Columbia Legacy 47717
2001 – Red Rubber Ball – Sundazed SC 11108
2001 – Neon – Sundazed 11109
Both reissues feature the original album tracks plus outtakes, demos, and non-LP singles tracks.

Members
Tom Dawes – (born July 25, 1944, Albany, New York – died October 13, 2007, New York) – lead vocals, lead guitar, bass
Don Dannemann – (born May 9, 1944, Brooklyn, New York) – lead vocals, rhythm guitar
Marty Fried – (born Martin Fried, 1944, Wayside, New Jersey, died September 1, 2021, Southfield, Michigan) drums, vocals
Earle Pickens – keyboards (first album) – (1969 to present, a general surgeon in Gainesville, Florida)
Michael Losekamp – (born Robert Michael Losekamp, September 8, 1946, Dayton, Ohio) keyboards, vocals (second & third albums); (retired engineer for AT&T)
Pat McLoughlin – (born June 23, 1952, Columbus, Ohio) – vocals, rhythm guitar, percussion
Don White – (born April 30, 1953, Columbus, Ohio) – lead guitar, vocals
Scott Langley – (born James Scott Langley, July 9, 1965, West Jefferson, Ohio) – drums, vocals
Mike Shoaf – (born June 29, 1951, Columbus, Ohio) – bass guitar, vocals
Mike "Roscoe" Rousculp – (born May 30, 1949, Lima, Ohio – died May 16, 2019, Tipp City, Ohio) – bass guitar, vocals
Dean Kastran - (born October 22, 1948, Mansfield, Ohio) – Bass guitar, vocals

References

External links
 http://www.thecyrkle.com  
 https://www.facebook.com/thecyrkle/

Garage rock groups from Pennsylvania
Columbia Records artists